The 1981 Grand National (officially known as The Sun Grand National for sponsorship reasons) was the 135th renewal of the Grand National horse race that took place at Aintree Racecourse near Liverpool, England, on 4 April 1981.

It is remembered for the winning horse Aldaniti, who had recovered from chronic leg problems, and his jockey Bob Champion, who had recovered from cancer. Aldaniti's injuries dated back to 1976, while Champion had been diagnosed with testicular cancer in 1979. However, Aldaniti was nursed back to optimum form ahead of the race, and Champion overcame lengthy hospitalisation and chemotherapy to win the National by a distance of four lengths. In second place was the 8/1 favourite, Spartan Missile, ridden by 54-year-old amateur jockey and grandfather John Thorne. The story of Bob Champion and Aldaniti was made into a film Champions, with John Hurt portraying Champion. The film is based on Champion's book Champion's Story, which he co-wrote with close friend and racing journalist and broadcaster Jonathan Powell.

Finishing order

Non-finishers

Media coverage

David Coleman presented Grand National Grandstand on the BBC in what turned out being one of the most famous National's of all-time.

Aftermath

The story of Champion and Aldaniti become known as Racing's greatest fairytale, and has become a lasting inspiration to people battling cancer ever since. Two years after the victory, the Bob Champion Cancer Trust was created  and the story inspired a movie of Bob's own personal battle to get fit to ride in the National the following year, starring John Hurt.

References

External links

 1981
Grand National
Grand National
Grand National
20th century in Merseyside